Ancylocera is a genus of beetles in the family Cerambycidae, containing the following species:

 Ancylocera amplicornis Chemsak, 1963
 Ancylocera bicolor (Olivier, 1795)
 Ancylocera bruchi Viana, 1971
 Ancylocera cardinalis (Dalman, 1823)
 Ancylocera michelbacheri Chemsak, 1963
 Ancylocera nigella Gounelle, 1913
 Ancylocera sallei Buquet, 1857
 Ancylocera sergioi Monné & Napp, 2001
 Ancylocera spinula Monné & Napp, 2001

References

 
Trachyderini
Cerambycidae genera